San Bernardino is a village in Oaxaca, Mexico, in the municipality of Santa María Tonameca.

Coatecas Altas Zapotec is spoken as a result of families coming to the village from Coatecas Altas, Oaxaca.

References

External links 

Populated places in Oaxaca